Mirosław Szłapka (born 19 September 1956) is a Polish equestrian. He was born in Buk, then in the Poznań Voivodeship, currently within the Greater Poland Voivodeship. He competed in eventing at the 1980 Summer Olympics in Moscow, where he placed sixth in the individual competition.

References

1956 births
Living people
People from Poznań County
Polish male equestrians
Olympic equestrians of Poland
Equestrians at the 1980 Summer Olympics
Sportspeople from Greater Poland Voivodeship